Abu Bakar Kamara (born 29 July 1929) is a Sierra Leonean former politician. He was Minister of Finance of Sierra Leone from 1977 to 1978 under President Siaka Stevens. He served as First Vice President of Sierra Leone from 1987 to 1991 under President Joseph Saidu Momoh. Both he and Second Vice President Salia Jusu-Sheriff resigned in September 1991.

References

Vice-presidents of Sierra Leone
Finance ministers of Sierra Leone
All People's Congress politicians
Living people
1929 births